Burta (also Romanized as Būrtā) is a village in Tamin Rural District, in the Central District of Mirjaveh County, Sistan and Baluchestan Province, Iran. At the 2006 census, its population was 132, in 23 families.

References 

Populated places in Mirjaveh County